5040 Rabinowitz, provisional designation , is a stony Phocaea asteroid from the inner regions of the asteroid belt, approximately 6 kilometers in diameter. It was discovered by Dutch–American astronomer Tom Gehrels at Palomar Observatory on 15 September 1972. Contrary to most of his discoveries, this asteroid is unrelated to the Palomar–Leiden survey and exclusively credited to Tom Gehrels.

Orbit and classification 

The stony S-type asteroid is a member of the Phocaea family, a group of asteroids with similar orbital characteristics, named after its largest member, 25 Phocaea. It orbits the Sun in the inner main-belt at a distance of 1.9–3.0 AU once every 3 years and 9 months (1,373 days). Its orbit has an eccentricity of 0.23 and an inclination of 24° with respect to the ecliptic. A first precovery was taken at the discovering observatory in 1971, extending the body's observation arc by one year prior to its official discovery observation.

Physical characteristics

Rotation period 

In July 2013, a rotational lightcurve for this asteroid was obtained from photometric observations by Czech astronomer Petr Pravec at the Ondřejov Observatory. The well-defined lightcurve gave a rotation period of  hours with a brightness variation of 0.33 in magnitude.

Diameter and albedo 

The Collaborative Asteroid Lightcurve Link assumes an albedo of 0.23, derived from the Phocaea family's namesake, and calculates a diameter of 6.4 kilometers with an absolute magnitude of 13.18.

Naming 

This minor planet was named after American astronomer David Rabinowitz (born 1960), a discoverer of minor planets himself and researcher at Yale University. The naming also honors his work for the Spacewatch program. The official naming citation was published by the Minor Planet Center on 1 September 1993.

Notes

References

External links 
 Asteroid Lightcurve Database (LCDB), query form (info )
 Dictionary of Minor Planet Names, Google books
 Asteroids and comets rotation curves, CdR – Observatoire de Genève, Raoul Behrend
 Discovery Circumstances: Numbered Minor Planets (5001)-(10000) – Minor Planet Center
 
 

 

005040
Discoveries by Tom Gehrels
Named minor planets
19720915